Pamela Samuelson is the Richard M. Sherman '74 Distinguished Professor of Law and Information Management at the University of California, Berkeley with a joint appointment in the UC Berkeley School of Information and Boalt Hall, the School of Law.

Education and early career
A 1971 graduate of the University of Hawaii and a 1976 graduate of Yale Law School, Samuelson practiced law as a litigation associate with the New York law firm Willkie Farr & Gallagher before becoming an academic. From 1981 through June 1996 she was a member of the faculty at the University of Pittsburgh School of Law, from which she visited at Columbia, Cornell, and Emory Law Schools.

Academic career 
She was appointed Visiting Professor of Law at Harvard Law School for the Fall 2007 term.  She is also co-director of the Berkeley Center for Law and Technology and a co-founder of Authors Alliance.  She has been a member of the University of California at Berkeley School of Law faculty since 1996.

Technology and society 

Her principal area of study is intellectual property law. She has written and spoken about the challenges that new information technologies are posing for public policy and traditional legal regimes. She founded the Samuelson Law, Technology and Public Policy Clinic at the University of California at Berkeley in 2000, with funding from Mitch Kapor and with an endowment from Samuelson and  her husband, Bob Glushko. She is a Fellow of the Association for Computing Machinery (ACM), a Contributing Editor of Communications of the ACM, a past Fellow of the John D. & Catherine T. MacArthur Foundation, an Honorary Professor of the University of Amsterdam. She is a member of the board of directors of the Electronic Frontier Foundation and of the Open Source Applications Foundation, as well as a member of the advisory board for the Electronic Privacy Information Center. In 2013, she was inducted into the American Academy of Arts and Sciences.

In 2016, Samuelson cosigned an amicus curiae brief for "Intellectual Property Professors" in support of Star Athletica in Star Athletica v. Varsity Brands.

Awards and honors

 Samuelson received a MacArthur "genius award" in 1997.
  She received the Anita Borg Institute Women of Vision Award for Social Impact in 2005.
 On November 2, 2015, Samuelson gave the Brace Lecture (named for publisher Donald Brace), an annual address by a distinguished figure in the field of domestic copyright law, at Fordham University School of Law.

Works
 Samuelson, P., Davis, R., Kapor, M. D., & Reichman, J. H. (1994). Manifesto concerning the Legal Protection of Computer Programs, A. ColUM. l. reV., 94, 2308.
"A Case Study on Computer Programs", Global dimensions of intellectual property rights in science and technology, Part 3, Editors Mitchel B. Wallerstein, Mary Ellen Mogee, Roberta A. Schoen, National Academies Press, 1993, 
"Towards More Sensible Anti-circumvention Regulations", Financial cryptography: 4th international conference, FC 2000, Editor Yair Frankel, Springer, 2001, 
"'The New Economy', and Information Technology Policy", American economic policy in the 1990s, Editors Jeffrey A. Frankel, Peter R. Orszag, MIT Press, 2002, 
Peter S. Menell, Mark A. Lemley, Robert P. Merges, Pamela Samuelson, Software and Internet law, Editor Mark A. Lemley, Aspen Publishers, 2003, 
"Should economics play a role in copyright law and policy?", Developments in the economics of copyright: research and analysis, Editors Lisa Takeyama, Wendy J. Gordon, Ruth Towse, Edward Elgar Publishing, 2005, 
"Challenges in Mapping the Public Domain", The future of the public domain: identifying the commons in information law, Editors Lucie M. C. R. Guibault, P. B. Hugenholtz, Kluwer Law International, 2006,

References

External links

 "Pamela Samuelson", Huffington Post
 "Legally Speaking: The Dead Souls of the Google Booksearch Settlement", O'Reilly Radar
 Prof. Samuelson's web page at the School of Information
 Prof. Samuelson's web page at the Boalt Hall School of Law
 Open Source Development and Distribution of Digital Information Webcast

Year of birth missing (living people)
Living people
UC Berkeley School of Law faculty
Computer law scholars
Copyright scholars
Copyright activists
American legal scholars
MacArthur Fellows
University of Hawaiʻi alumni
Yale Law School alumni
University of Pittsburgh faculty
Columbia University faculty
Cornell University faculty
Emory University faculty
Harvard Law School faculty
Fellows of the Association for Computing Machinery
People associated with Willkie Farr & Gallagher